Boat (translit. Boteu; , alt. title No Boys, No Cry, formerly known as House) is a 2009 film directed by Kim Young-nam and starring Ha Jung-woo and Satoshi Tsumabuki in the lead roles. It is a South Korean-Japanese co-production. The film charts the experiences and cross cultural friendship of a couple of smugglers.

Plot
Hyung-gu, a young smuggler, was raised by his boss Bo-kyeong after his mother left him when he was six years old. Hyung-gu's boss asks him to work with a Japanese man named Toru; Toru needs the money to support his younger sister. Hyung-gu and Toru are forced to live on Hyung-gu's boat and kidnap a Korean woman named Ji-su, which leads to trouble.

Cast
 Ha Jung-woo as Hyung-gu
 Satoshi Tsumabuki as Toru
 Cha Soo-yeon as Ji-su
 Shihori Kanjiya as Toru's ex-girlfriend
 Eri Tokunaga as Toru's younger sister
 Lee Dae-yeon as Bo-kyeong
 Tasuku Emoto as Takashi
 Morio Agata
 Kim Bu-seon

References

External links
 
 
 

2009 films
Japanese action drama films
Japanese multilingual films
2009 multilingual films
2000s Japanese-language films
2000s Korean-language films
South Korean multilingual films
South Korean action drama films
2000s Japanese films
2000s South Korean films